Valaji or Valachi is a rāgam in Carnatic music (musical scale of South Indian classical music). It is a pentatonic scale (audava or owdava rāgam, which means "of 5"). It is a janya rāgam (derived scale), as it does not have all the seven swaras (musical notes). The equivalent of Valaji in Hindustani music is Kalāvati.

Structure and Lakshana 

Valaji is a symmetric rāgam that does not contain rishabham or madhyamam. It is a pentatonic scale (audava-audava rāgam in Carnatic music classification). Its  structure (ascending and descending scale) is as follows (see swaras in Carnatic music for details on below notation and terms):

 : 
 : 
(the notes used in this scale are shadjam, antara gandharam, panchamam, chathusruthi dhaivatham and kaisiki nishadham)

Valaji is considered a janya rāgam of Chakravakam, the 16th Melakarta rāgam, though it can be derived from other melakarta rāgams, Harikambhoji, Vagadheeswari, Ramapriya, Vachaspati or Nasikabhooshani, by dropping both rishabham and madhyamam. Since Chakravakam is lowest in ordinal number among these 6 melakarta scales, Valaji is associated with it.

Popular compositions 
Valaji is a pleasing scale, but has only a few compositions in classical music. It has been used to score film music as well. Here are some popular kritis composed in Valaji.

Jalandhara supithasthe japa kusuma bhasure by Muthiah Bhagavatar
Santatam Ninne by G. N. Balasubramaniam
Sri Gayatri, by Saint Gnanananda Tirtha (Sri Ogirala Veera Raghava Sarma)
Tândava Priyâ by Kalyani Varadarajan
Dari Yavudayya, Nachike Padabeda by Purandara dasa
Padhame thunai by Papanasham Shivan

Related rāgams 
This section covers the theoretical and scientific aspect of this rāgam.

Graha bhedam 
Valaji's notes when shifted using Graha bhedam, yields another pentatonic rāgam Abhogi. Graha bhedam is the step taken in keeping the relative note frequencies same, while shifting the shadjam to the next note in the rāgam. For more details and illustration of this concept refer Graha bhedam on Abhogi.

Scale similarities 
Malayamarutam is a rāgam which has shuddha rishabham in both ascending and descending scales in addition to the notes in Valaji. Its  structure is : 
Nagasvaravali is a rāgam which has the shuddha madhyamam in place of the nishadam. Its  structure is : 
Mohanam is a rāgam which has the chathusruti rishabham in place of the nishadam. Its  structure is :

Film Songs

Language:Tamil

Notes

References

Janya ragas